The Chiba Sotobō Toll Road (千葉外房有料道路 Chiba Sotobō Yūryōdōro) is a partially tolled road in Chiba Prefecture, Japan. The route is operated by the Chiba Prefecture Road Authority. Chiba Prefecture Route 67 is designated along the whole highway. It was built to alleviate traffic along Chiba Prefecture Route 20, connecting southeastern Chiba Prefecture to Chiba and Tokyo further to the west. The toll road runs between the Ken-Ō Expressway and Chiba-Tōgane Road, paralleling Route 20 and JR East's Sotobō Line from Mobara to Chiba. The toll road, unlike most toll roads in Japan, was not given an expressway number under the Ministry of Land, Infrastructure, Transport and Tourism's "2016 Proposal for Realization of Expressway Numbering".

Route description
The western terminus of the toll road is in Chiba city at an intersection with the Oami Highway (Chiba Prefecture Route 20). 
The eastern terminus is in Mobara near the border with Chiba city. The speed limit is 60 km/h for the entire route; even on the 4 lane section of road where speeding is commonplace. Due to this police heavily patrol the section of the toll road.

Junction list
The entire toll road is in Chiba Prefecture.

|colspan="8" style="text-align: center;"|Through to Chiba Prefecture Route 21

References

Toll roads in Japan
Roads in Chiba Prefecture